The Rouge River (English: Red River) is a river flowing in the Laurentides, in the municipality of Grenville-sur-la-Rouge, in the Argenteuil Regional County Municipality, in the administrative region of Laurentides, in the west of Quebec, in western Quebec, Canada.

This  river takes its source at Lac de la Fougère and flows south to empty into the Ottawa River near Pointe-au-Chêne and flows north of Mont Tremblant, of which it is a tributary of the left bank. It is in the Laurentides, about halfway between Ottawa and Montreal. Its name is derived from the reddish tint of its sandbanks.

The river is a popular destination for whitewater rafting. Its last 10 kilometres are renowned for rafting. It is the main body of water in an area comprising hills, valleys, lakes, and waterfalls.

Communities
 Bell Falls
 Rivington
 Harrington
 Arundel
 Huberdeau
 Brébeuf
 Lac-Duhamel
 Lac Lamoureux
 La Conception-Station
 Daoust
 Marchand
 L'Annonciation
 Rivière-Rouge
 Petit-Lac-Lanthier
 Lac-Lanthier-Ouest
 L'Ascension
 Sienna

Features 
 Mouth of rivière-rouge: 
 Rapides Maskinongé: 
 The Canyons
 The Turbo
 Surprise
 Devil's Door

Hydrography 

The main neighboring watersheds of the Rouge River are:
 north side: Maskinongé River;
 west side: Petite rivière Saumon, Petite-Nation River, Maskinongé River, Nominingue River;
 east side: Kingham River, Calumet River, Beaven River, Diable River, Macaza River, Lenoir River;
 south side: Ottawa River.

From Fougère Lake, the Rouge River flows south, crossing Red Lake formed by the widening of the river. The river winds along the entire length of the western limit of the Rouge-Matawin Wildlife Reserve that it separates from the Zec de la Maison-de-Pierre.

The landscape also changes from a rocky plateau to a sandy plain and crosses its first village, L'Ascension, then Labelle and La Conception. About twenty kilometers downstream, it meets the Nominingue River and then changes its course in a south-southeast direction. At the end of a  route, the Red River flows on the north shore of the Ottawa River between the village of Calumet and the municipality of Pointe-au-Chêne, in the territory of the Argenteuil Regional County Municipality.

Among its main tributaries, the Rouge River receives water from:
 east side: the Lenoir River, Macaza River and the rivière du Diable rivers, passing to Saint-Jovite;
 west side: the Maskinongé River and the Nominingue River.

The course of the river is generally peaceful (except the last segment of ) with many U and S meanders.

2019 floods
In late April 2019, water flows reached 10 times the normal flow due to heavy flooding in the area. Fearing dam failure, authorities evacuated citizens down the stream of the Bells Fall dam.

Mythic creature 
"The Forgotten Wonder of the Rivière Rouge," also known as "Bisso," is a creature from Canadian folklore that is said to inhabit the Rouge River. The story tells of a nineteenth century man riding down the country road in a horse-drawn carriage when he suddenly lost control of the vehicle and plunged into the depths of the river. After being presumed dead for several years, the man took the form of a husky aquatic creature who meandered in the river, only coming to the surface to hunt. Bisso is said to possess an insatiable appetite and would hunt whatever animals would venture to the river bank. Swimming with just its eyes above the water, Bisso is believed to use floating vegetation as camouflage when it is stalking its prey. There have been alleged sightings of the creature in the Rouge River, with witnesses claiming to have seen Bisso's eyes as well as the trail of bubbles from its "snaps" (gaseous bowel movements.)

History 
The region was inhabited by the Iroquois until the end of the 19th century. Under the leadership of the priest François-Xavier-Antoine Labelle, the river served as a path of colonization which saw the birth of most of the communities along its course and its tributaries. The Chute Bell Powerhouse was installed  from its mouth in 1915.

Toponymy 
The Rouge River valley served as a penetration route for the pioneers responding to calls for colonization in the north of Montreal made by the priest Antoine Labelle. In French Canada, the Catholic dioceses exercised the role of planning for the establishment of parishes and of organizing parishes in the territories of colonization.

A map by Franquelin, dated 1699, indicated the "Red River" as an extension of the "North River". Hypotheses have been made by historians as to the origin of this hydronym. The most likely hypothesis makes the link with the slightly reddish hue of the waters of the river, due to the oxidation of certain types of rocks of the Canadian Shield that cross the river. However, its water is said to be clearer than that of neighboring rivers. Another explanation would come from a red chalk deposit located at Grand lac Nominingue that the Algonquins and Iroquois used to paint themselves.

Flowing at the western edge of the Rouge-Matawin Wildlife Reserve, the term "red" of this river has been transposed to the latter.

The toponym Rivière Rouge was formalized on December 5, 1968, by the Commission de toponymie du Québec.

Among other things, the river gave its name to the Rivière-Rouge Ecological Reserve, the Rouge-Matawin wildlife reserve and the communities of Rivière-Rouge and Grenville-sur-la-Rouge.

References 

 The Atlas of Canada map showing of rouge river and last few sets of rapids
 Fowke, Ethan. Canadian Folklore.  New York: Oxford University Press, 1988.

See also 
 Ottawa River, a watercourse
 Petite rivière Saumon, a stream
 Macaza River, a stream
 Maskinongé River, a watercourse
 Grenville-sur-Rouge, a municipality
 Argenteuil Regional County Municipality (MRC)
 List of rivers of Quebec

Rivers of Laurentides